Donald Robert McCallister (May 3, 1934 – January 26, 2021) was an American professional golfer.  He won two events on the PGA Tour and three other major tournaments in the 1960s.  He later worked as the head pro at golf clubs in California and Oregon, and competed on the Senior PGA Tour.

McCallister played for the University of Southern California golf team as an amateur, receiving All-American honors from 1956 to 1958, and becoming the first player to win the Pac-8 Conference and Southern California Intercollegiate Athletic Conference titles in consecutive years.  He turned professional in 1959 and played full-time on the tour after serving in the U.S. Army. He retired from the tour in 1969 after being affected by early onset arthritis.

Early life
McCallister was born in Toledo, Ohio, on May 3, 1934.  The McCallister family moved to Corona, California, and joined the San Gabriel Country Club.  He started playing golf when he was 14 years old, after his father Don urged him to try the sport.

McCallister was awarded a scholarship to attend the University of Southern California.  There, he earned All-American honors three times as a member of the golf team – first-team in 1956 and 1957, third-team in 1958.  He was the first (and, at the time of his death, the only) player to win both the Pac-8 Conference and Southern California Intercollegiate Athletic Conference titles in back-to-back seasons.

McCallister entered several PGA Tour events as an amateur, and ultimately turned professional in 1959.  He only started playing full-time on the tour one year later, after serving in the U.S. Army and being stationed at Fort Ord in Monterey Bay.  He established a record of shooting a score of 62 at the base golf course, which has stood for over sixty years.

Professional career
During his time on the tour, McCallister was sponsored by Lawrence Welk.  He won the first title of his professional career at the 1960 Paul Bunyan Open, held at the Penobscot Valley Golf Club in Orono, Maine.  He finished ahead of Tony Lema and won $2,000 in prize money.

McCallister won two PGA Tour events during his career, both of which played in California in October.  His first title came at the 1961 Orange County Open Invitational.  He came from behind by five strokes on the final day to defeat Al Geiberger, his friend and former college teammate.  On the final hole, he hit a  birdie to finish ahead by two shots.

McCallister did not win any events during the 1962 PGA Tour.  He was runner-up at that year's Phoenix Open, finishing 12 shots behind winner Arnold Palmer.  He subsequently tied for third in attempting to defend his Orange County Open title, coming two shots short of a playoff between Bob Rosburg and Lema (the eventual winner) after three-putting on the last hole.  That same year, he partnered with Major League Baseball player Albie Pearson to win the Bing Crosby Pro-Am.  He finished the season 44th on the money list.

McCallister's second win came at the only incarnation of the Sunset-Camellia Open Invitational in 1964.  He finished ahead of both Pete Brown and Stan Leonard by a single stroke to win $3,300.  His best finish in a major came at the 1965 PGA Championship, when he finished tied for eighth place.

McCallister was afflicted by an early onset of arthritis around 1964, which seriously restricted his physical ability. He managed to play five more seasons before retiring in 1969.  During this time, he won three tournaments outside of the PGA Tour.  He triumphed at the Mexican Open and Southern California PGA Championship in 1966.  In the former, he defeated Dudley Wysong by one shot, hitting a  birdie on the last hole.  In the latter, he beat Bud Holscher to the $15,000 first prize, which was the richest sectional event by the Professional Golfers' Association of America at the time.  McCallister won the 1967 Maracaibo Open Invitational by defeating Wes Ellis in a playoff, after the latter tied the score on the final hole of normal play.

Later years and death
McCallister played on the Senior PGA Tour after reaching the age of 50.  He played a total of 16 events on that tour from 1984 to 1987, and made his last appearance at the GTE Northwest Classic in 1995.  He also teamed up with Lon Hinkle for the Shootout at Jeremy Ranch.  McCallister established the Redding (California) Area Junior Golf Association, and held the position of head pro at Charbonneau Golf Club in Wilsonville, Oregon, as well as at the Butte Creek Country Club in Chico and Gold Hills Country Club in Redding.

McCallister was married to Carol until his death.  He had eight children: Kim, Bill, Michael, Tracy, Bobby, Brent, Heather, and Missy.  He died on January 26, 2021, in Molalla, Oregon.  He was 86, and suffered from Parkinson's disease in the twelve years leading up to his death.

Professional wins (5)

PGA Tour wins (2)

Source:

Other wins (3)
1966 Mexican Open, Southern California PGA Championship
1967 Maracaibo Open Invitational

Results in major championships

CUT = missed the half-way cut
"T" = tied
Note: McCallister never played in The Open Championship.
Source:

Results in senior major championships

"T" = tied
Note: McCallister never played in The Tradition or The Senior Open Championship.
Source:

References

External links

American male golfers
USC Trojans men's golfers
PGA Tour golfers
PGA Tour Champions golfers
Golfers from Ohio
Golfers from California
Golfers from Oregon
Sportspeople from Riverside County, California
Sportspeople from Toledo, Ohio
People from Wilsonville, Oregon
Sportspeople from the Portland metropolitan area
People from Corona, California
1934 births
2021 deaths